Leopold, Prince of Hohenzollern (22 September 1835 – 8 June 1905) was the head of the Swabian branch of the House of Hohenzollern, and played a fleeting role in European power politics, in connection with the Franco-Prussian War.

He was born into the dynasty's Sigmaringen branch, which inherited all the dynasty's Swabian lands when the Hohenzollern-Hechingen branch became extinct.

Leopold's parents were Josephine of Baden and Karl Anton, Prince of Hohenzollern. Leopold was the older brother of King Carol I of Romania and father of the future King Ferdinand of Romania. Carol ascended the Romanian throne in 1866, and Leopold renounced his rights to the Romanian succession in favor of his sons in 1880.

Entry into European controversy

After the Spanish Revolution of 1868, which overthrew Queen Isabella II, Leopold was offered the Spanish Crown by the new government. The offer was supported by Prussian chancellor Otto von Bismarck but opposed by the French Emperor Napoleon III on the grounds that the installation of a relative of the Prussian king would result in the expansion of Prussian influence and the encirclement of France.

In Spain, when the news spread that Leopold was a candidate for the crown, he began to be called "Leopoldo Olé-Olé si me eligen" (Leopoldo Olé-Olé if they choose me) as a play on words because of the difficult pronunciation of his surname for the Spanish.

Leopold initially refused the offer, but on 21 June 1870, he accepted the Spanish crown and the name "Leopoldo I". He was forced on 11 July to decline again.

Additional demands that were made by the French government heightened diplomatic tensions between Paris and Berlin. The deliberate shortening of a diplomatic communiqué, the Ems Dispatch, led to declaration of war by France. Prussia's speedy mobilization, together with the support of the other members of the North German Confederation, resulted in French defeat, the consequences of which were the collapse of the Second French Empire, to be replaced by the Third Republic, and the creation of the German Empire. France lost most of Alsace and part of Lorraine and had to pay Prussia war reparations.

Marriage and issue

On 12 September 1861, Leopold married Infanta Antónia of Portugal, daughter of Queen Maria II of Portugal and King Ferdinand II of Portugal. They had the following children:

 William, Prince of Hohenzollern (7 March 1864 – 22 October 1927) he married Princess Maria Teresa of Bourbon-Two Sicilies on 27 June 1889. They had three children. He remarried Princess Adelgunde of Bavaria on 20 January 1915.
 Ferdinand I of Romania (25 August 1865 – 20 July 1927). King of Romania from 1914 to 1927. In 1893, he married Princess Marie of Edinburgh. They had six children. 
Prince Karl Anton of Hohenzollern (1 September 1868 – 21 February 1919) he married Princess Joséphine Caroline of Belgium on 28 May 1894. They had four children.

Had Leopold succeeded to the Spanish throne, he could possibly have founded a second German dynasty in Spain, following the extinction of the House of Austria less than two centuries earlier.

Honours
Leopold received the following decorations and awards:

Ancestry

References

1835 births
1905 deaths
Generals of Infantry (Prussia)
German people of the Franco-Prussian War
Members of the Prussian House of Lords
People from Sigmaringen (district)
People from the Province of Hohenzollern
Princes of Hohenzollern
Princes of Hohenzollern-Sigmaringen
German landowners
Grand Crosses of the Order of Saint Stephen of Hungary
2
2
Grand Crosses of the Order of the Star of Romania
Grand Crosses of the Order of the Crown (Romania)
Heirs apparent who never acceded
Sons of monarchs
Non-inheriting heirs presumptive